Calamotropha baibarellus is a moth in the family Crambidae. It was described by Jinshichi Shibuya in 1928. It is found in Taiwan.

References

Crambinae
Moths described in 1928